Seen Through the Veils of Darkness (The Second Spell) is the first full-length album by the Norwegian black metal band Gehenna.  A vinyl LP version, limited to 1000 copies, was released in 1995 by Necromantic Gallery Productions.

Track listing
"Lord of Flies" - 5:00
"Shairak Kinnummh" - 5:04
"Vinterriket" - 3:53
"A Witch Is Born" - 4:21
"Through the Veils of Darkness" - 4:32
"The Mystical Play of Shadows" - 3:08
"The Eyes of the Sun" - 3:26
"A Myth..." - 8:55
"Dark Poems Author" - 5:10

Credits
Sanrabb - Guitars, Vocals
Dolgar - Guitars
Svartalv - Bass
Sarcana - Keyboards
Dirge Rep - Drums
Garm - guest vocals on the track Vinterriket

External links
SSMT review of Seen Through The Veils Of Darkness

1995 debut albums
Gehenna (band) albums
Cacophonous Records albums